Gajala (maiden name Gazala Shaikh Khan) is an Indian actress, who has predominantly appeared in Telugu and Tamil films. She made her debut in the Telugu film Nalo Vunna Prema in 2001.

Early life
Gazala Shaikh Khan lived in Kuwait before her entry into the film industry.

Career
An Interview with The Times of India, 17 March 2014; She said that- "I don't see films as a career. Even when I started acting, I was doing films because I enjoy cinema. I never decided that I will do films till I'm 40 or 50 years old. I'm not struggling to work in cinema. If I get a good film, I'll be happy to do it. Otherwise, I'm not worried," she said." - Times of India

Filmography

References

External links
 

Indian film actresses
Actresses in Telugu cinema
Actresses in Tamil cinema
Living people
Actresses in Malayalam cinema
Actresses in Kannada cinema
1985 births